Vice-Admiral Henry Hill (23 May 1772 – 7 June 1849) was a Royal Navy officer.

Early life
He was born in St Boniface parish, Bonchurch, the second son of Col. William Hill, who served as aide-de-camp to Count de Lipp in the Seven Years' War, and Elizabeth Popham (1744–1809), great-granddaughter of MP Alexander Popham..  His younger brother was Archdeacon Ven. Justly Hill.

Career 
Hill entered the Royal Navy 10 November 1787 as a volunteer on board , commanded by Sir Richard John Strachan. On his return to England in the autumn of 1793 Hill joined , commanded by Sir John Jervis. He was promoted to lieutenant on 17 December 1793. In 1794 he participated in the capture of Fort Royal, Martinique. He was promoted to the rank of commander on 24 July 1796. In the spring of 1798 he was appointed to the Sea-Fencibles in the Isle of Wight, England. From 27 June 1799 until 1 January 1801 he commanded  in the Mediterranean Sea and also . After various other appointments, he later commanded , successfully blockading the French ports on their coast and destroying much of their coastal trade. After further appointments he was promoted to rear-admiral on 22 July 1830 and further promoted to vice-admiral on 23 November 1841. Reportedly "In every ship commanded by the Vice-Admiral when afloat he won the approbation of the Admiralty. On  he was particularly fortunate in eliciting that of H.R.H. the Lord High Admiral (William IV)". On 26 February 1845 he was granted the Good Service pension.

Family 
He married, first, Anne, daughter of the late Reverend James Worsley, of Gatcombe, Isle of Wight, England; and secondly, Caroline, daughter of the late Joseph Bettesworth, Esquire, of Ryde, Isle of Wight, England.  He had four daughters and six sons. The eldest being a captain and later a governor of the Gold Coast, Henry Worsley Hill.

References 

Royal Navy vice admirals
Royal Navy personnel of the Napoleonic Wars
1775 births
1849 deaths